Clément Tabur (born 24 January 2000) is a French tennis player. He primarily plays on the ITF Futures Tour and the ATP Challenger Tour. Tabur has a career-high ATP singles ranking of No. 311, achieved on 15 August 2022. Tabur has reached 6 singles finals on the ITF Futures tour with a record of 3-3, as well as reaching 14 doubles finals also on the ITF Futures Tour with a record of 9-5.

Career

Juniors 

As a junior, Tabur reached a career high ITF junior combined ranking of world No. 28,  achieved on 22 January 2018.

In January 2018, Tabur alongside Hugo Gaston won the 2018 Australian Open boys' doubles, defeating Rudolf Molleker and Henri Squire in the final.

Early career

Tabur made his debut appearance on the ATP Tour at the 2018 French Open where he was granted a wild card entry into the main doubles draw alongside juniors partner and compatriot Hugo Gaston. They were defeated in the first round by Julio Peralta and Horacio Zeballos in straight sets 2–6, 2–6. The duo were once again given a wildcard at the 2019 French Open with a similar outcome, bowing out in the first round to Guido Pella and Diego Schwartzman 6–4, 3–6, 5–7.

Junior Grand Slam finals

Doubles: 1 (1 title)

ATP Challenger and ITF Futures/World Tennis Tour finals

Singles: 6 (3–3)

Doubles: 16 (9–7)

External links
 
 
 

2000 births
Living people
French male tennis players
Australian Open (tennis) junior champions
Tennis players at the 2018 Summer Youth Olympics
Grand Slam (tennis) champions in boys' doubles